One from the GHL is a Hebrew poem, later composed as a song, written by Nathan Alterman during the 1948 Arab-Israeli war. It refers to the tens of thousands of Holocaust survivors and other Jewish refugees that had immigrated to the newly created state of Israel and were immediately drafted into the IDF and sent to the front lines with no military training. Many of the new recruits died in battle shortly after their immigration to Israel. The name of the draft is G.H.L.- Hebrew acronym for overseas draft.  Overall some 20,000 newly arrived immigrants were drafted to the IDF during the war composing a third of the Israeli army manpower, some three hundred of whom died in battle.
  
Nathan Alterman wrote this poem in his weekly column in the daily newspaper Davar and published it in the last day of the war, in protest of the inhumane treatment of these soldiers. The poem criticizes with irony the instrumental use of the state towards the soldiers compared with the pretension of the state to serve as a homeland to Jewish refugees.

Later the poem was composed as a song by Shem Tov Levy and first performed by Arik Einstein in his 1985 album "land product". It is often sung during the Israeli Remembrance Day and in ceremonies marking the 1948 war of independence.

Lyrics

Songs of the 1948 Arab–Israeli War
1948 poems
Israeli poetry
Israeli songs
Hebrew-language songs